Religion in Singapore is characterised by a wide variety of religious beliefs and practices due to its diverse ethnic mix of peoples originating from various parts of the world. A secular state, Singapore is commonly termed as a "melting pot" of various religious practices originating from different religious denominations around the world. Most major religious denominations are present in the country, with the Inter-Religious Organisation, Singapore (IRO) recognising 10 major religions. A 2014 analysis by the Pew Research Center found Singapore to be the world's most religiously diverse nation.

The most followed religion in Singapore is Buddhism, a plurality with 31.1% of the resident population declaring themselves as adherents at the most recent decennial census in 2020. A large number of Buddhists in Singapore are Chinese, with 40.4% of the ethnic Chinese population in Singapore declaring themselves to be one. There are also sizeable numbers of non-Chinese ethnic groups in Singapore that practices Buddhism. People with no religious affiliation (atheist, agnostic or other irreligious life stances) form the second largest group at 20% of the population. Christianity comes in at 18.9%. Islam, at 15.6%, is followed mainly by Malays, though there are also Indians adhering to it. Taoism comes in at 8%, and Hinduism, at 5%, is followed mainly by the Indians.

Tolerance
The government of Singapore is officially tolerant of different religions and encourages religious harmony among the different religions found in Singapore. However, some religions or denominations are officially banned by the government, as they are deemed as cults, such as Jehovah's Witnesses and the Unification Church, although their followers do still practise in secrecy. Some religions, especially those practised by Chinese ethnic groups, have merged their places of worship with other religions such as Hinduism and Islam. A prominent example is that of Loyang Tua Pek Kong Temple (situated in the eastern coastal line) wherein three religions, namely Taoism, Hinduism, and Buddhism are co-located.

Younger Singaporeans tend to combine traditional philosophies with religious beliefs introduced when the British colonised Singapore. One prominent example is South Bridge Street, which was a major road through the old Chinatown, where it houses the Sri Mariamman Temple (a south Indian Hindu temple that was declared a national historical site in the 1980s), as well as the Masjid Jamae Mosque that served Chulia Muslims from India's Coromandel Coast.

In schools, children are taught in social studies lessons about the Maria Hertogh riots and the 1964 Race Riots, as a reminder of the consequences of inter-religious conflict. Mixed-race classes, interaction between students of different races and the celebration of religious festivals also help inculcate religious tolerance and understanding from a young age.

Another religious landmark in Singapore is the Armenian Church of Gregory the Illuminator, the oldest church in Singapore, which was completed in 1836. It was also the first building in Singapore to have an electricity supply, when electric fans and lights were installed. Today, the church no longer holds Armenian services, as the last Armenian priest retired in the 1930s. Nonetheless, the church and its grounds have been carefully preserved and various Oriental Orthodox Church services are still held in it occasionally and Coptic Orthodox Church of Alexandria service on the first weekend of every month.

Statistics and demographics
The Singapore census includes detailed data on religion and ethnicity, and is taken on a ten or five-year basis. Figures for religion for the past four decades are:

The figures for Singaporeans practiced religion by ethnicity for the past four decades are as follows:

Below are the Singapore's Resident Population Aged 15 years and over by Religion and Age Group:

The above figures refer to the resident population only, and do not include the non-resident population (Singapore authorities do not release figures for the non-resident population which accounted for 18.33% of Singapore's population in 2005).

Most Singaporeans celebrate the major festivals associated with their respective religions. The variety of religions is a direct reflection of the diversity of races living there. The Chinese are mainly Buddhists, Taoists and Christians, with many irreligious exceptions. Almost all Malays are predominantly Muslims (around 99%), while Indians are mostly Hindus, but with significant numbers of Muslims, Christians and Sikhs from the Indian ethnic groups.

Religion is still an integral part of cosmopolitan Singapore. Many of its significant buildings are religious, be it temples, churches or mosques. An understanding of these buildings do play a part in contributing to appreciation of their art.

Taoist and Confucian doctrines and deities, together with ancestral worship, are combined in various ways in the Chinese folk religions and Chinese folk religious sects.

Major religious communities

Buddhism

A large plurality of Singaporeans declare themselves as Buddhists, with 31.1% of the Singaporean population being Buddhists in 2020 census.

Most missionaries hail from China, Tibet, Taiwan, Thailand, Myanmar, Sri Lanka and Japan.

There are Buddhist monasteries and centres from the three major traditions of Buddhism in Singapore: Theravada, Mahayana and Vajrayana. Most Buddhists in Singapore are Chinese and many of them adhered to Mahayana tradition.

Whilst a majority of Buddhists in Singapore are traditionally ethnic Chinese, there is a significant number of Buddhists in Singapore that come from other ethnic groups such as the Thai, Sinhalese and Burmese. Due to the presence of these Buddhists from these ethnic groups, there are Buddhist centres and temples that serves these communities, such as Wat Ananda Metyarama Thai Buddhist Temple, Sri Lankaramaya Buddhist Temple and Burmese Buddhist Temple.

Buddhism of every tradition is well represented in Singapore, such as Tibetan Buddhism, Thai Buddhism and Chinese Mahayana Buddhism. They were brought together over years of immigration to Singapore, brought by many foreign Buddhist monks. Due to the melting pot of Buddhist traditions here in Singapore, it is not uncommon to see Thai Buddhist Temples and Tibetan Buddhist Centres, besides the numerous Chinese Buddhist Temples.

The sight of such temples gives Buddhists in Singapore a warm feeling in their hearts, as these are places where they spend their times with their loved ones the most, such as going to temples to offer incense and attend meditation and chanting services.

Occasionally, Buddhist monks from the west such as Ajahn Brahm, who resided in Australia, is invited to Singapore to give Buddhist Talks to the public. Additionally, there are also Buddhist societies set up in Singapore tertiary institutions such as NUS Buddhist Society, Ngee Ann Polytechnic Buddhist Society, Singapore Polytechnic Buddhist Society and SMU Dhamma Circle have encouraged youths in Singapore gain a better insight into Buddhism.

Recently, there are many Buddhist temples in Singapore that are undergoing major renovations, to have a fresh new building facade and to cater to the younger crowd. Singapore Buddhist Lodge has recently renovated their Main Shrine Hall and since it has open its doors to the public, it has been drawing hundreds of people from all over Singapore to visit.

In addition, Kong Meng San Phor Kark See Monastery has also opened the Buddhist College of Singapore to provide a centre for Buddhist education to Singaporeans.

Such additions and renovations to these temples have improved their visitor count greatly.

As time goes by, a sizeable number of Buddhist temples in Singapore have decided to use English over Mandarin as their main language of communication during their temple services to cater to the growing English-Speaking Buddhist congregation.

Indirectly, many young Chinese Singaporeans are now spending time with their family to rediscover their Buddhist roots.

Below are the ethnic breakdown of Buddhists according to the 2020 Singapore Census of Population as follows:

Christianity

18.9% of Singaporeans identified as Christians in the 2020 census. Of these, 35.8% or 220,900 people identified as Catholics. Among Protestants, the Methodist Church in Singapore is the largest denomination, with some 42,000 members in 46 churches, as well as Orthodox. Prominent megachurches have emerged over the last two decades with the rise of the Charismatic Movement; these include New Creation Church, City Harvest Church and Faith Community Baptist Church, which count among Singapore's 10 largest charities, according to a report by The Straits Times in 2019.

Below are the ethnic breakdown of Christians according to the 2020 Singapore Census of Population as follows:

Islam

According to the 2020 census, 15.6% of the resident population in Singapore registered themselves as Muslims. Most mosques in Singapore cater to Sunni Muslims due to the vast majority of Singaporean Muslims adhering to the Sunni Shafi'i or Hanafi school of thought, although there are mosques that cater to the needs of the Shia community as well. There are approximately 200 Ahmadi. Singapore also contains the oldest Muslim women's organization in the world: Young Women Muslim Association of Singapore.

Whilst a majority of Muslims in Singapore are traditionally ethnic Malays, there is also a significant growing number of Muslims from other ethnic groups; in particular, there is a sizeable number of Muslims amongst ethnic Indians that statistically include Tamil Muslims and ethnic Pakistanis in Singapore as well. For this reason, a number of mosques (mostly Tamil-speaking) specifically cater to the needs of the Indian Muslim community. Additionally, under the direction of the Islamic Religious Council of Singapore (MUIS), English is increasingly being used as the language of administration, religious instruction and sermons for Friday prayers in mosques across Singapore to cater to Muslims who may not necessarily be Malay-speaking.

Below are the ethnic breakdown of Muslims according to the 2020 Singapore Census of Population as follows:

Taoism

According to the 2020 Census, 8.8% of Singaporeans declared themselves as Taoist.

Followers of Taoism ("The Way") adhere to the teachings of the ancient Chinese religious philosophy of Laozi, the founder of Taoism, also known as the Pure Celestial Worthy of the Way. Besides codified Taoism—which in some places, like Taiwan, is mostly represented by the Zhengyi order—Taoism in Singapore also comprehends a wide variety of Chinese folk religions.

Feng shui, literally "wind and water", originated from the school of yin and yang and is deeply rooted in ancestral worshiping that seeks to harmonise the pnuemas between the living (yang) and the dead (yin). Ancestral worship is a common practice of the Chinese and the Qingming Festival during the second full moon is observed by the majority. This reflects that Chinese tradition remains extant in modern Singapore. They pray in tribute to their bereaved ancestors, where their spirits are honoured with offerings including food, beverages, joss paper, incense sticks, and even paper houses, which are intrinsic practices for Taoists.

Although Taoist temples and shrines are abundant in Singapore, the official number of followers has dwindled drastically over the years from 22.4% to 8.5% between the years 1990 to 2000. This, however, may be accounted for by the unclear delineation between Taoism and Buddhism in popular perception. For example, the difference between the two religions can be negligible enough that when a Chinese says that they "offer incense sticks" it is usually assumed that they are Buddhist even though they may not actually be Buddhist. The 2010 and 2015 censuses have shown that Taoist identity has declined again to represent about 10% of Singapore's population.

Below are the ethnic breakdown of Taoists according to the 2020 Singapore Census of Population as follows:

Hinduism

According to the latest 2020 census, 5.0% of Singaporeans declare themselves as Hindus.

The majority of Singapore's present Hindus are descendants of Indians who migrated soon after the founding of Singapore in 1819. The early temples are still the central points of rituals and festivals, which are held throughout the year.

Below are the ethnic breakdown of Hindus according to the 2020 Singapore Census of Population as follows:

Sikhism

The first Sikhs to settle in Singapore came in 1849. As of 2020 Census, there are 12,051 Sikhs (approximately 0.35% of the whole population) was registered in Singapore.

Below are the ethnic breakdown of Sikhs according to the 2020 Singapore Census of Population as follows:

Small religious communities

Jainism

The Jain community celebrated 100 years in Singapore by rededicating the "Stanak" and consecrating the idol of Mahavira. This brought together the two main sects of Jains, the Śvētāmbara and Digambara. The Singapore Jain Religious Society actively engages in keeping traditions and practices alive by transmitting Jain principles to the next generation. It also has a strong history of community involvement. The Jains have no temple, but the Singapore Jain Religious Society has a building on 18 Jalan Yasin.

As of 2006, there were 1,000 Jains in Singapore.

Zoroastrianism
There is a small community of about 300 Parsi Zoroastrians residing in Singapore. There is no fire temple in Singapore, but Zoroastrian House is home to the Parsi Zoroastrian Association of South East Asia, and contains a prayer hall for the community.

Judaism

The first Jews to settle in Singapore came from India in 1819. As of 2008, there are about 1,000 Jews in Singapore. Their religious activities centre around two synagogues, the Maghain Aboth Synagogue and the Chesed-El Synagogue.

There were over 1,500 Jewish inhabitants in 1939. Many were interned during the Japanese occupation of Singapore in World War II, and a number subsequently emigrated to Australia, England, the United States, and Israel. As a result, the community numbered approximately 450 in 1968. In 2005, the number reached 300. Because of a large Ashkenazi immigration rate to Singapore in recent years, the population is now between 800 and 1,000, mostly foreign Ashkenazi Jews.

Bahá'í Faith
K. M. Fozdar (1898–1958) and Shirin Fozdar (1905–1992), were the first to introduce the Bahá'í Faith to Singapore when they settled here in 1950. Shirin Fozdar was well known throughout Singapore and Asia for her work in the cause of women's emancipation. Her arrival in Singapore had been preceded by an article in The Straits Times on 15 September 1950 under the heading "A Woman with a Message". Through the efforts of Dr and Mrs Fozdar, by 1952 there were enough Bahá'ís in Singapore to form the first Local Spiritual Assembly. The community has since grown to over 2000 members and today there are five Local Spiritual Assemblies in Singapore.

Local Spiritual Assemblies oversee a wide range of activities including the education of children, devotional services, study classes, discussion groups, social functions, observance of holy days, marriages and funeral services. Bahá'í marriage is recognised under the laws of Singapore and the solemniser is appointed by the Registrar of Marriages. The Bahá'ís have been provided with a cemetery in Choa Chu Kang since 1957 and the nine Bahá'í Holy Days have been gazetted since 1972. Members of the first Local Spiritual Assembly of the Bahá'ís of Singapore, incorporated 28 July 1952. The five Local Spiritual Assemblies come under the jurisdiction of the Spiritual Assembly of the Bahá'ís of Singapore, the national governing council which was established in 1972.

The national governing council also appoints the executive members of the various offices which plan and carry out social service projects and collaborate with government and non-government organisations. The Bahá'í teachings stress the importance of obedience to civil government and laws. While Bahá'ís may accept non-partisan government appointments, they do not engage in partisan political activity. The members firmly uphold the injunction of Bahá'u'lláh, that 'they must behave towards the government with loyalty, honesty and truthfulness'.

There is no Baha'i House of Worship in Singapore, but there is a Baha'i Centre that serves as the administrative headquarters of the religion in Singapore.

New religious movements

Brahma Kumaris
The Brahma Kumaris are a millenarian spiritual movement that originated in Hyderabad, Sindh in modern-day Pakistan in the 1930s. Founded by spiritualist and medium Lekhraj Kripalani，originally a follower of the Vaishnavite Vallabhacharya sect, the movement is known for the prominent role played by celibate women in it, and purports to teach an ancient form of meditation known as Raja Yoga. The group has since distanced itself from its Hindu roots, preferring to use the language of New Age and personal growth movements to draw students. Followers believe in an imminent "End of the World" situation that is slated to happen before 2036 but in more recent teachings, leaders have downplayed many of the apocalyptic prophecies of the destruction of the planet revealed earlier. Many of the group's beliefs, referred to as "The Knowledge", are largely kept hidden from outsiders. The Singapore Brahma Kumaris Centre operates out of its Hindoo Road location in Little India.

Christian Science
Christian Science is a non-trinitarian Christian new religious movement developed by Mary Baker Eddy who argued in her 1875 book Science and Health that sickness is an illusion that can be corrected by prayer alone. She founded the Church of Christ, Scientist in 1879 with 26 followers. The church is known for its Pulitzer Prize-winning newspaper, the Christian Science Monitor. In Singapore, the church holds weekly Sunday Services at The Regent Hotel on Cuscaden Road.

Eckankar
Eckankar, a new religious movement founded by Paul Twitchell in 1965, is active in Singapore through the Eckankar Satsang Singapore. There is no published data available on the size of the group, which holds meetings at Peace Centre.

Falun Gong
Falun Gong is a new religious movement founded in China by Li Hongzhi in the early 1990s. Riding on the qigong boom and initially enjoying support from Chinese officialdom, the movement was estimated to have 70 million practitioners in 1999. The Chinese government soon denounced the group as a cult and embarked on a nationwide crackdown. The group was registered as the Falun Buddha Society in 1996 and is headquartered at Geylang Road. The association is believed to have some 500 to 1,000 practitioners in Singapore, and publishes the Singapore edition of The Epoch Times in English and Chinese. In January 2001, 15 Falun Gong practitioners, mostly Chinese nationals, were charged with illegal assembly after organising an unauthorised vigil at a park in memory of fellow believers they say died in police custody in China. In July 2006, nine members were charged with disseminating material encouraging people to quit the Chinese Communist Party, and another three members were charged with meditating and going on hunger strike outside the Chinese embassy.

Hare Krishna
The Hare Krishna movement is active in Singapore but not through the International Society for Krishna Consciousness (ISKCON) which was banned by the government in the 1970s and remains banned today. Foreign ISKCON monks as well as Srila Prabhupada, founder of the movement, were barred by wary government authorities from entering Singapore, and all attempts by followers to officially register the society failed. Nevertheless, by avoiding affiliation with ISKCON, Hare Krishna followers have subsequently succeeded in registering their societies under different names. These include the Sri Krishna Mandir in Geylang and the Gita Reading Society at the Gauranga Centre in Serangoon.

Mata Amritanandamayi Math
The Mata Amritanandamayi Math is a new Hindu movement established in 1981 by Indian guru Mātā Amritānandamayī Devī, popularly referred to by her followers as "Amma", or by the media as the "hugging saint". Singapore was the destination of her first trip out of India in 1987 and since then, she has made frequent visits to the city-state, often attracting tens of thousands to darshan events in recent years. The Amriteswari Society was registered in Singapore in 1993 and is located at Hindoo Road in Little India.

Latter-day Saints

The Church of Jesus Christ of Latter-day Saints first began holding meetings in 1963 with a handful of followers that were living in Singapore in 1963. Church membership grew to about 100 in 1970 when the government began restricting proselytization and visas for missionaries. In 1974, the church created the Singapore Mission, with G. Carlos Smith as the mission president. By January 1980, Singapore was opened to full-time missionaries. As of 2021, the church claims about 3,400 members in the country and operates three chapels in Bukit Timah, Pasir Panjang, and Sengkang. In August 1992, Jon Huntsman Jr., a Latter-day Saint was appointed as the United States Ambassador to Singapore. He served less than a year and left in June 1993. 21 Latter-day Saint missionaries have reportedly been sent out from Singapore to 15 countries.

Nichiren Shōshū
Nichiren Shōshū is a branch of Nichiren Buddhism based on the teachings of the 13th-century Japanese priest Nichiren. The Nichiren Shoshu Buddhist Association (Singapore) is located at Sims Avenue. A schism in Japan in 1991 saw the excommunication of Soka Gakkai out of Nichiren Shōshū, following which the respective branches in Singapore also parted ways.

Quan Yin Famen
The Quan Yin Famen, or the Quan Yin Method, is a transnational cybersect founded in 1988 by the self-styled Taiwanese-Vietnamese Ching Hai, known variously as Suma Ching Hai or Supreme Master Ching Hai. The sect has been denounced in China as a cult and today propagates its teachings through an online TV station called Supreme Master Television. Ching Hai is the progenitor of the Loving Hut vegan restaurant chain which claims some 200 outlets in 35 countries. The Supreme Master Ching Hai Association (Singapore) is based at the Avari Centre on Geylang Road and runs a Loving Hut restaurant on Joo Chiat Road.

Sathya Sai Baba movement
The Sathya Sai Baba movement is a new Hindu religious movement inspired by Indian spiritual guru Sathya Sai Baba (1926-2011) who followers claim to be the avatar of Shiva and Shakti and the reincarnation of Shirdi Sai Baba. During his lifetime, Sai Baba taught the unity of religions and drew crowds with purported materialisations of vibhuti and other objects, as well as claims of miraculous healings, resurrections, clairvoyance, bilocation and purported omniscience and omnipotence. The movement's history in Singapore goes back to the early 1970s, when a handful of Singaporeans began making trips to India to visit Sai Baba. In 1975, the Sri Satha Sai Society, Singapore was registered, and in 1988, a S$613,500 purchase was made for a 8,000 square foot freehold site at 133 Moulmein Road.

Shinnyo-en
Shinnyo-en is a Japanese Buddhist order founded in 1936 by Shinjō Itō and his wife Tomoji in the tradition of the Daigo branch of Shingon Buddhism. The group was formally registered in Singapore in 1994 and claims some 1,800 members who observe rituals and ceremonies at a temple at Jalan Kechot.

Soka Gakkai
Soka Gakkai is a Japanese new religious movement based on the teachings of the 13th-century Japanese Buddhist priest Nichiren. Founded in Japan in 1930 and affiliated with Nichiren Buddhism, the movement soon made its way to Singapore. The Singapore Soka Association was officially registered in 1972. Its membership was estimated to be about 40,000 people in 25,000 households in 2005. The group has been an active participant at the annual National Day Parade and Chingay events. The association is headquartered in Tampines and runs a Soka Kindergarten there. In October 2020, it broke ground on a new centre in Punggol.

Transcendental Meditation
The Transcendental Meditation movement was founded by Indian guru Maharishi Mahesh Yogi in the mid-1950s. Central to the movement is a specific form of silent, mantra meditation that is practiced for 15–20 minutes twice per day and is taught by certified teachers through a standard course of instruction, which costs a fee that varies by country. The Singapore TM Centre is run by The Spiritual Regeneration Movement Foundation of Singapore and located at Cendex Centre on Lower Delta Road. It charges S$1,500 per adult and S$2,400 per family for a course that includes personal instruction and follow-up group sessions.

True Jesus Church
True Jesus Church is a non-trinitarian restorationist Christian sect that emerged in 1917 in Beijing, China. With teachings influenced by both the early Pentecostal and Adventist movements, the church practices Sabbath keeping, speaking in tongues, foot washing, faith healing and water baptism by full body immersion in natural living waters, with head bowed and face downwards. Members of the True Jesus Church Singapore meet in four worship venues: Adam Road, Sembawang, Serangoon and Telok Kurau.

Tzu Chi
Tzu Chi is a new Buddhist movement that was established in 1966 by the Taiwanese bhikkuni Master Cheng Yen. Tzu Chi Singapore was founded in 1993 and headquartered at Elias Road in Pasir Ris. The movement runs clinics providing free general practitioner, traditional Chinese medicine and dental services to elderly residents and low-income households in Redhill and Khatib. It also operates the Lakeside Family Medicine Clinic in Jurong West and a day rehabilitation centre in Jurong East. The group's education mission runs pre-schools in Yishun and Toa Payoh and a Continuing Education Centre at Elias Road. The group's charitable arm provides financial assistance for kidney patients and people with HIV/AIDS.

World Mission Society Church of God
The World Mission Society Church of God is a Korean sabbatarian, restorationist Christian new religious movement established in 1964. The church believes that Ahn Sahng-hong, a former Seventh-Day Adventist preacher who died in 1985, is Christ, and refers to his wife Zahng Gil-jah, who is still living, variously as "God the Mother", "Mother Jerusalem", "New Jerusalem Mother", and "Heavenly Mother". The World Mission Society Church of God Singapore is located at Cheong Chin Nam Road.

No religious affiliation

As of 2020, 20% of Singaporeans had no religious affiliation.

Non-religious Singaporeans are found in various ethnic groups and all walks of life in the diverse, multicultural city state. The proportion of Irregious people is higher among Chinese people, with one in four Chinese having no religion in the 2020 Census. The Singapore non-religious community itself is very diverse, with many calling themselves atheists, agnostics, free thinkers, humanists, secularists, theists or sceptics. In addition, there some people who decline religious labels but still practice traditional rituals like ancestor worship. The number of non-religious people in Singapore has risen gradually over the decades. Census reports show that those who said they have no religion rose from 13.0% in 1980 to 17.0% in 2010 and to 20.0% in 2020 . In recent years, social gatherings of non-religious people are becoming popular in Singapore. The Singapore Humanism Meetup is a major network of over 400 secular Humanists, freethinkers, atheists, and agnostics. In October 2010, the Humanist Society (Singapore) became the first humanist group to be gazetted as a society.

Below are the ethnic breakdown of Irreligious according to the 2020 Singapore Census of Population as follows:

Restrictions

The constitution provides for freedom of religion; however, other laws and policies restricted this right in some circumstances. Publications and public discussions of religious issues are generally censored, along with negative or inflammatory portrayals of religion. The Government does not tolerate speech or actions that it deems could adversely affect racial or religious harmony.

Jehovah's Witnesses

In 1972, the Singapore government de-registered and banned the activities of Jehovah's Witnesses in Singapore on the grounds that its members refuse to perform military service (which is obligatory for all male citizens), salute the flag, or swear oaths of allegiance to the state. Singapore has banned all written materials published by the International Bible Students Association and the Watchtower Bible and Tract Society, both publishing arms of the Jehovah's Witnesses.  A person who possesses a prohibited publication can be fined up to S$2,000 and jailed up to 12 months for a first conviction.

Unification church
In 1982, the Minister for Home Affairs dissolved the Holy Spirit Association for the Unification of World Christianity, also known as the Unification Church (and colloquially as "Moonies"), for allegedly breaking up families.

Shincheonji church
In February 2020, Singapore began a probe into the unregistered local chapter of the Korean new religious movement Shincheonji Church of Jesus. The apocalyptic, messianic sect was known for being the centre of the first COVID-19 outbreak in South Korea. The group had fewer than 100 members in Singapore and operated covertly through a front company called Spasie Enrichment. The Ministry of Home Affairs said the group had earlier tried, and failed, to register a company under the name of Heavenly Culture, World Peace and Restoration of Light.

In November 2020, 21 members of the group were arrested for being members of an unlawful society. Five South Korean nationals who held key positions were repatriated and the group's front entities were dissolved.

Islam
In 2011, Wikileaks published diplomatic cables which attributed controversial comments regarding Islam to Lee Kuan Yew, the Minister Mentor of Singapore's government. Wikileaks quoted Lee as having described Islam as a "venomous religion". Lee later denied making the comments.

The incident followed Lee's controversial book release Lee Kuan Yew: Hard Truths to Keep Singapore Going. In the book, Lee claimed that Singaporean Muslims faced difficulties in integrating because of their religion, and urged them to "be less strict on Islamic observances" – an assertion that is seemingly contrary to statistics and studies on the levels of social acceptance, tolerance and interracial marriages practised by Singaporean Muslims.

The speakers for broadcasting the Islamic call to prayer were turned inwards to broadcast towards the interior of the mosques as part of a noise abatement campaign in 1974.

References

 
Religion in Asia